Nero Wolfe is a 1982 Canadian radio drama series adapted from the Nero Wolfe mysteries by Rex Stout. The series stars Mavor Moore as Nero Wolfe, and Don Francks as Wolfe's assistant Archie Goodwin. Thirteen hour-long episodes were presented by the Canadian Broadcasting Corporation.

Production
In 1982, Canadian actor, producer, writer and cultural pioneer Mavor Moore starred as Nero Wolfe in the Canadian Broadcasting Corporation's 13-episode radio series Nero Wolfe, also known as Rex Stout's Nero Wolfe. Don Francks portrayed Wolfe's assistant and legman Archie Goodwin. The supporting cast included Cec Linder as Inspector Cramer, Frank Perry as Fritz Brenner, and Alfie Scopp as Saul Panzer.

Written, produced and directed by actor Ron Hartmann, the series was praised for its high production values and accurate presentation of Stout's original stories.

Fiona Reid, Jack Creley and Neil Munro were featured in the debut episode, "Disguise for Murder", broadcast January 16, 1982. Other repertory players in the series included Jackie Burroughs, Lally Cadeau, Jayne Eastwood, Brian George, Martha Gibson, Lynne Griffin, Barbara Hamilton, Patricia Hamilton, Helen Hughs, Charmion King, Budd Knapp, Maria Loma, Arch McDonnell, Meana E. Meana, Mary Peery, Eric Peterson, August Schellenberg, Ailine Seaton, Terry Tweed and Sandy Webster.

The final episode, "Murder Is No Joke", aired April 10, 1982. The series was released on audiocassette by Durkin Hayes Publishing (DH Audio).

Episodes

See also 

The Adventures of Nero Wolfe, a 1943–44 ABC radio series starring Santos Ortega and Luis van Rooten
The Amazing Nero Wolfe, a 1945 Mutual radio series starring Francis X. Bushman
The New Adventures of Nero Wolfe, a 1950–51 NBC radio series starring Sydney Greenstreet

References

Canadian radio dramas
Detective radio shows
Nero Wolfe
Radio programmes based on novels
1982 radio programme debuts
1982 radio programme endings
CBC Radio One programs